Altus/Quartz Mountain Regional Airport  is a city-owned, public-use airport located three nautical miles (6 km) north of the central business district of Altus, a city in Jackson County, Oklahoma, United States. It is included in the National Plan of Integrated Airport Systems for 2011–2015, which categorized it as a general aviation facility.

Facilities and aircraft 
Altus/Quartz Mountain Regional Airport covers an area of 434 acres (176 ha) at an elevation of 1,433 feet (437 m) above mean sea level. It has one runway designated 17/35 with a concrete surface measuring 5,501 by 75 feet (1,677 x 23 m).

For the 12-month period ending October 8, 2010, the airport had 15,330 general aviation aircraft operations, an average of 42 per day. At that time there were 39 aircraft based at this airport: 85% single-engine, 13% multi-engine, and 3% ultralight.

References

External links 
 Altus/Quartz Mountain Regional Airport
 Altus/Quartz Mountain Regional (AXS) at Oklahoma Aeronautics Commission Airport Directory
 Aerial image as of February 1995 from USGS The National Map
 

Airports in Oklahoma
Buildings and structures in Jackson County, Oklahoma